Halifax is an unincorporated community in St. Francois County, in the U.S. state of Missouri.

History
A post office called Halifax was established in 1888, and remained in operation until 1925. The community was named after Halifax, Nova Scotia.

References

Unincorporated communities in St. Francois  County, Missouri
Unincorporated communities in Missouri